National Road 9 (also known as Ääsmäe-Haapsalu-Rohuküla maantee; Ääsmäe-Haapsalu-Rohuküla highway) begins from Ääsmäe at the Ääsmäe interchange of the T4. The highway ends at Rohuküla port.

Route
The total length of the road is 80.7 km.

See also
 Transport in Estonia

References

External links

N9